Vyacheslav Kabanov (born 8 August 1968) is a Uzbekistani freestyle swimmer. He competed in three events at the 1996 Summer Olympics.

References

External links
 

1968 births
Living people
Uzbekistani male freestyle swimmers
Olympic swimmers of Uzbekistan
Swimmers at the 1996 Summer Olympics
Place of birth missing (living people)
Asian Games medalists in swimming
Asian Games bronze medalists for Uzbekistan
Swimmers at the 1994 Asian Games
Medalists at the 1994 Asian Games
20th-century Uzbekistani people
21st-century Uzbekistani people